Kytäjä is a village located in Hyvinkää, Finland. Kytäjä is along the connecting road 1361 about 15 kilometers west of the center of Hyvinkää and about 17 kilometers east of Loppi's Läyliäinen. Until 1917, the village belonged to the parish of Nurmijärvi and until 1968 to the rural municipality of Hyvinkää. , which dominates the Kytäjä's landscape, flows down the Kytäjoki River into the Vantaa River.

Kytäjä Church was completed in 1939 and was designed by the then owner of Kytäjä Manor, Väinö Vähäkallio. The Finnish Heritage Agency has defined church as a nationally significant built cultural environment. The Rytkö School (or Näs School) in Kytäjä was founded in 1874. The Kivisenoja School, founded in 1903, was closed in 1993. In the vicinity of the church there is a clubhouse called Kytäjän Maapirtti.

There is a bus line between Kytäjä and the center of Hyvinkää. The Hyvinkää–Karkkila railway passed through Kytäjä in 1918–1967. Railway station was closed in 1967 when the railway was demolished. The station building is still left.

 course is one of the largest golf courses in Finland.

See also 
 Herunen
 Hyvinkäänkylä

Sources

Literature

References

External links 

Kytäjä - Official Website
Kytäjä Golf

Hyvinkää
Villages in Finland